Gran Hermano VIP 3 was the third season of the reality television Gran Hermano VIP series. The series was launched in January 2015 on Telecinco, 10 years after last season was aired. Jordi González returned to host the series, as the last time he hosted a GH series was with El Reencuentro 2. On the Grand Finale of Gran Hermano 15 it was officially confirmed GHVIP would start in January. It was also announced that José and Juan, who are brothers from the musical group Los Chunguitos, were the first housemates of the season.

Housemates

Nominations table

Notes 
 : The housemates nominated a member of each group with 1 point.
 : Kiko was exempt from nominations as he was a new housemate.
 : From this round the housemates nominated with 2 and 1 point.
 : Aguasantas, Fede, Israel and Sandro won the right of saving a nominee, they saved Kiko. Because of that, Sandro and Víctor were added to the nomination list.
 : This round of nominations had a twist. There were two telephones, a green one and a red one. If a housemate chooses the green one, they would nominate with 2 and 1 point. If a housemate chooses the red one, they would nominate with 3, 2 and 1 point.
 : Ángela and Chari were exempt from nominations as they were a new housemates.
 : Nominations and eviction were cancelled as there was proof that some housemates cheated on nominations.
 : A new round of nominations took place on Sunday and Belén was banned from nominating as she was the one who cheated on the previous nominations.
 : This round of nominations had a twist. Nominations were done with two dice rolls. Each housemate had to nominate with the points shown from the dice rolls.
 : For this round, the public voted the girls as the winners of the weekly task. The reward was to choose an evicted housemate who would nominate for her with an extra point. Aguasantas and Chari chose Ares, Ángela chose Sandro and Belén chose Ylenia.
 : There were no nominations this week and instead, the public were allowed to vote for their winner. The housemate with the fewest votes would be evicted the day before the final in a surprise eviction.

Nominations total received

Debate: Blind results

Twists

Masters and servants
On the premiere of Gran Hermano VIP 3, the housemates were divided into two teams, Belén's team and Olvido's team. The audience decided which team would be servants and which team would be masters. The servants had to live in the servant's quarters and can only enter into the noble quarters if one of the masters requires their help. The roles will be reversed. The first team to be the servants were Olvido's team with 74% of votes.

On Day 4, the master group chose Ylenia as the worst servant so she continued being a servant. The servant group chose Víctor as the best master so he continued being a master. The rest of the members of each group switched roles. Kiko on Day 5 passed 2 missions and he joined the master group.

Days 1 - 5
 Teams

Days 5 - 8
 Teams
On Day 5 Kiko entered the house and joined the master group. The servant members became masters except Ylenia and the master members became servants except Víctor. The captains remained the same.

Heaven and Hell

Days 19 - 22

 After spending a day, Ares leaves the Hell for medical problems and a history of epilepsy. Ylenia, as oracle sent Israel to hell replacing Ares.

Days 22 - 26
Gran Hermano order to the Oracle (Ylenia) change the status of the contestants in the task, she has to send one from hell to heaven (Israel) and two from heaven to hell (Aguasantas & Víctor).

Ratings

"Galas" 
 On Thursdays.

"Debates"

External links
 Gran Hermano VIP Official Website at Telecinco
 Gran Hermano Main Site

See also
 Main Article about the show

2010 Spanish television seasons
Gran Hermano (Spanish TV series) seasons